Robert Land (1887–1940) was an Austrian-Jewish film director of Moravian descent.

Biography
Born as Robert Liebmann to a German-speaking Jewish Family in Kroměříž. Land moved to Vienna to study German literature and art history. He started directing movies in 1919. He chose the pseudonym Robert Land in order to avoid being mistaken with film critic and screenwriter Robert Liebmann (1890-1942). He made movies in Austria and Germany until 1933, when he fled to Czechoslovakia after Nazis' rise to power. Unable to find work he went to Italy in 1934, before returning to Prague a year later. He directed three movies in Czechoslovakia – Jana (1935), Arme kleine Inge''' (1936) and The Doll (1938). In 1938 he moved to Paris, where he died on 12	October 1940. He's buried at Cimetière parisien de Thiais.

Selected filmography
 The Jewess of Toledo (1919, screenwriter)
 Don Juan (1922)
 The Curse (1924)
 The Bank Crash of Unter den Linden (1926)
 Alpine Tragedy (1927)
 The Dashing Archduke (1927)
 Venus in Evening Wear (1927)
 Princess Olala (1928)
 Two Red Roses (1928)
 The Abduction of the Sabine Women (1928)
 Dame Care (1928)
 The Merry Widower (1929)
 I Kiss Your Hand, Madame (1929)
 The Hero of Every Girl's Dream (1929)
 Love and Champagne (1930)
 Boycott (1930)
 Weekend in Paradise (1931)
 24 Hours in the Life of a Woman (1931)
 Arme kleine Inge (1936)
 The Doll'' (1938)

Bibliography

External links

Austrian male screenwriters
Austrian film directors
Czech screenwriters
Male screenwriters
Czech film directors
German-language film directors
Moravian Jews
Austrian Jews
People from Kroměříž
1887 births
1940 deaths
20th-century Austrian screenwriters
20th-century Austrian male writers